Lotononis pachycarpa is a species of flowering plant in the family Fabaceae. It is found only in Namibia. Its natural habitat is cold desert.

References

Crotalarieae
Flora of Namibia
Least concern plants
Taxonomy articles created by Polbot